Khojaly Requiem is a work of Alexander Tchaikovsky, a modern Russian composer, pianist, teacher and musical public figure, People's Artist of Russia, professor at the Moscow State Conservatory, nephew of Boris Alexandrovich Tchaikovsky, dedicated to Khojaly massacre.

History of creation 
Khojaly's Requiem was written by Alexander Tchaikovsky specifically for the traditional festival held annually in the Azerbaijani city of Gabala. The work tells not only about the tragedy in Khojaly, but is also dedicated to the people of many countries who survived the horrors of war.

The author himself said the following about the history of writing his work:

According to Tchaikovsky, by writing this requiem, he demonstrated the musicians' support to those people in many countries of the world who survived the horrors of war.

Composition 

Alexander Tchaikovsky actively uses in his composition mugham, the oldest Azerbaijani genre of oral musical tradition.

Concert premiere 
The premiere of the requiem took place on 7 August 2012 on the final day of the IV Gabala International Music Festival. The piece was performed by the "Moscow Soloists" chamber orchestra.

In the concert, conducted by the artistic director of the State Symphony Orchestra "New Russia", and the founder of the chamber orchestra "Moscow Soloists", Yuri Bashmet, also took part the People's Artist of Azerbaijan and the USSR Farhad Badalbeyli (piano), the Russian-American conductor and cellist, the son of the pianist Oksana Yablonskaya and the oboist Albert Zayonts - Dmitry Yablonsky (cello) and the Honored Artist of Azerbaijan Sahib Pashazade (tar).

In his opening speech, Alexander Tchaikovsky noted that the requiem was born with the support of the Heydar Aliyev Foundation and at the suggestion of his closest friend Dmitry Yablonsky.

References

Requiems
2012 compositions
Works about Khojaly Massacre